The United Nations Educational, Scientific and Cultural Organization (UNESCO) World Heritage Sites are places of importance to cultural or natural heritage as described in the UNESCO World Heritage Convention, established in 1972. The Syrian Arab Republic accepted the convention on 13 August 1975, making its historical sites eligible for inclusion on the list. As of 2016, six sites in Syria are included.

The first site in Syria, Ancient City of Damascus, was inscribed on the list at the 3rd Session of the World Heritage Committee, held in Paris, France in 1979. Ancient City of Bosra and Site of Palmyra were inscribed the following year as the second and the third site, while Ancient City of Aleppo was added in 1986. Crac des Chevaliers and Qal'at Salah El-Din were added collectively to the list in 2006, followed by Ancient Villages of Northern Syria in 2011.

All six of Syria's properties have been placed on UNESCO's List of World Heritage in Danger since 2013, as their integrity has been to varied degrees compromised following the outbreak of the Syrian Civil War; Aleppo in particular has suffered extensive damage, while a number of prominent structures in Palmyra have been destroyed.

World Heritage Sites 
UNESCO lists sites under ten criteria; each entry must meet at least one of the criteria. Criteria i through vi are cultural, and vii through x are natural.

Tentative list
In addition to sites inscribed on the World Heritage List, member states can maintain a list of tentative sites that they may consider for nomination. Nominations for the World Heritage List are only accepted if the site was previously listed on the tentative list. As of 2016, Syria lists twelve properties on its tentative list:

Norias of Hama
Ugarit (Tell Shamra)
Ebla (Tell Mardikh)
Mari (Tell Hariri)
Dura-Europos
Apamea (Afamia)
Desert Castle: Qasr al-Hayr al-Sharqi
Ma'loula
Tartus: The City-fortress of the Crusaders
Raqqa-Rafiqah: The Abbasid City
Island of Arwad
Mari & Dura-Europos: Sites of Euphrates Valley

References

 
Syria
World Heritage Sites
World Heritage Sites